Pottstown Airport may refer to:

Heritage Field Airport (formerly Pottstown Limerick Airport) in Pottstown, Pennsylvania, United States (FAA: PTW)
Pottstown Municipal Airport in Pottstown, Pennsylvania, United States (FAA: N47)